Structuralist film theory is a branch of film theory that is rooted in structuralism, itself based on structural linguistics.

Overview
Structuralist film theory emphasizes how films convey meaning through the use of codes and conventions not dissimilar to the way languages are used to construct meaning in communication. However, structuralist film theory differs from linguistic theory in that its codifications include a more apparent temporal aspect. In other words, the site of the study (the film) is moving in time and must be analyzed in a framework which can consider its temporality. To that end, structuralist film theory is dependent on a new kind of sign, first proposed by the Prague linguistic circle, dubbed the ostensive sign.

An example of this is understanding how the simple combination of shots can create an additional idea: the blank expression on a person's face, an appetizing meal, and then back to the person's face. While nothing in this sequence literally expresses hunger—or desire—the juxtaposition of the images convey that meaning to the audience. Unraveling this additional meaning can become quite complex. Lighting, angle, shot duration, juxtaposition, cultural context, and a wide array of other elements can actively reinforce or undermine a sequence's meaning. This is known as the Kuleshov effect.

See also 
 Semiotic literary criticism
 Structural film

References

Film theory